Assassinaut is a 2019 American science fiction film directed by Drew Bolduc, starring Shannon Hutchinson, Jasmina Parent, Yael Haskal, Johnathan Newport, Vito Trigo and Irene Santiago.

Cast
 Shannon Hutchinson as Sarah
 Jasmina Parent as Charlie
 Yael Haskal as Brooke
 Johnathan Newport as Tom
 Vito Trigo as Commander
 Irene Santiago as President of the Earth
 Dietrich Teschner as Captain
 Lilly Nelson as Tiberia Bluntknuckle
 Mark Ashworth as The Past President

Release
The film was released on 30 July 2019.

Reception
Bobby LePire of Film Threat gave the film a rating of 7.5/10 and praised the performances, the action and the practical effects.

Oscar Goff of Boston Hassle wrote that while there are "times when it feels like the film almost has too many ideas", and the story "perhaps could have weathered an additional draft", the film "captures the spirit of derring-do that that implies", it "never wears out its welcome", and "each development is followed by another at just the right clip."

Ed Fortune of Starburst rated the film 3 stars out of 10 and wrote that it was "a waste of time for everyone involved and should be avoided", but praised the practical effects and called it a "solid showreel for the talent involved."

References

External links
 
 

American science fiction films
2019 science fiction films